Blow Your Own Horn is a 1923 American silent comedy film directed by James W. Horne and starring Warner Baxter, Ralph Lewis, and Derelys Perdue.

Cast
 Warner Baxter as Jack Dunbar 
 Ralph Lewis as Nicholas Small 
 Derelys Perdue as Anne Small 
 Eugene Acker as Augustus Jolyon 
 William H. Turner as Dinsmore Bevan 
 Ernest C. Warde as Gillen Jolyon 
 Johnny Fox as Buddy Dunbar 
 Mary Jane Sanderson as Julia Yates 
 Eugenie Forde as Mrs. Jolyon 
 Dell Boone as Mrs. Gilroy Yates 
 Billy Osborne as Percy Yates 
 Stanhope Wheatcroft as Timonthy Cole

References

Bibliography
 Munden, Kenneth White. The American Film Institute Catalog of Motion Pictures Produced in the United States, Part 1. University of California Press, 1997.

External links

1923 films
1923 comedy films
Silent American comedy films
Films directed by James W. Horne
American silent feature films
1920s English-language films
Film Booking Offices of America films
American black-and-white films
1920s American films